Gignous is a surname. Notable people with the surname include:

 Eugenio Gignous (1850–1906), Italian painter
 Lorenzo Gignous (1862–1958), Italian painter, nephew of Eugenio

See also
 Gignoux (disambiguation)

it:Gignous